Washington district or variant, may refer to:

United States
 Washington District, a Norfolk Southern railway line in Virginia
 Washington Vermont Senate District, the Vermont State Senate district encompassing Washington County
 Washington District, Jackson County, West Virginia, a former magisterial district that existed from 1863 to the 1990s
Washington District, South Carolina, a former judicial district that existed during 1791–1800
 Washington District, a mining district in Nevada established in the 1860s as part of the Reese River excitement
 Washington District, North Carolina, a former jurisdiction that existed during 1776–1777
Washington District Regiment

District of Columbia
 Washington, D.C.
 District of Columbia (until 1871), Washington's federal district
 District of Columbia's at-large congressional district, congressional district for Washington
 Naval District Washington (U.S. Navy)
 United States Army Military District of Washington (U.S. Army, Defense Department)
 Department of Washington (district of the U.S. Union Army, Department of War)
 District of Columbia Public Schools, school district for Washington
 Neighborhoods in Washington, D.C.

State of Washington
 Washington state legislative districts
 Washington's congressional districts
 Oregon and Washington District (Church of the Brethren)
 Lake Washington School District, King County
 School districts in the U.S. state of Washington, see List of school districts in Washington

Other uses
 Washington Avenue Historic District (disambiguation)
 Washington Street Historic District (disambiguation)
 Washington Historic District (disambiguation)
 Washington School District (disambiguation)

See also

 District of Columbia (disambiguation)
 
 Washington (disambiguation)
 District (disambiguation)
 Washington County (disambiguation)
 Washington Township (disambiguation)
 Washington State (disambiguation)